Parexaula is a genus of moths of the family Yponomeutidae.

Species
Parexaula isomima - Meyrick, 1909 

Yponomeutidae